"He's Back and I'm Blue" is a song written by Robert Anderson and Michael Woody, and recorded by American country music group The Desert Rose Band.  It was released in February 1988 as the third single from the album The Desert Rose Band.  The song was the fourth country hit for The Desert Rose Band and the first of two number ones for the group.  The single went to number one for one week and spent a total of fourteen weeks on the country chart.

Charts

Weekly charts

Year-end charts

References

1988 singles
The Desert Rose Band songs
Song recordings produced by Paul Worley
MCA Records singles
Curb Records singles
1987 songs